Christine Grosart is a cave diver and explorer. She holds the British women’s cave diving depth record. She is a trustee and team leader of the marine conservation charity Ghost Fishing UK.

Career
Following her family's interests, Grosart learnt scuba diving as a child. After leaving school at 16, she has had a diverse career. She initially worked in horse-racing for 10 years and rode in steeplechases. During this time she studied Geosciences with the Open University. In 2004 she changed career to train within the ambulance service, becoming qualified as a paramedic in 2010 with a degree from the University of the West of England.

She started cave diving with the Cave Diving Group in 2005 and has subsequently explored caves in the UK, France, Croatia and dived in caves in Mexico and also the USA. She is an examiner for the Cave Diving Group. By 2016 she had qualified as a dive medic. Grosart achieved a women’s solo cave diving depth record at Wookey Hole Caves, UK in 2009.

She works as a professional caving instructor with her own company and as a dive medic on saturation dive vessels in the North Sea.

Grosart is a trustee for the charity Ghost Fishing UK that was founded around 2015. She is the charity's secretary, a trustee and also a team diver and underwater photographer. She has led removal of abandoned, lost or discarded fishing gear from the sea around the British Isles that would otherwise cause a hazard to humans and animals in the sea.

Awards
In 2020 she was awarded fellowship of the Royal Geographical Society. In November 2020 she was included in the BBC Radio 4 Woman's Hour Power list 2020 because of her work as a volunteer diver Ghost Fishing UK and organisation of cleaning beaches around the south coast of England.

References

Cave diving explorers
Conservation biologists
British cavers
Alumni of the University of the West of England, Bristol
Living people
Year of birth missing (living people)